Yuncken Freeman, officially Yuncken Freeman Architects Pty Ltd, was an Australian architecture firm. Founded in Melbourne, Victoria in 1933, Yuncken Freeman grew steadily, particularly in the post-war economic boom to be a sizeable firm in Australia, with branch offices in Hong Kong as well as other parts of south-east Asia, until its dissolution during the late 1980s.

The firm gained early fame with the striking Sidney Myer Music Bowl, and then for major works in the 1960s and 70s such as starkly Modernist office towers in Melbourne by Barry Patten including BHP House and the State Government Offices, and projects by Roy Simpson, such as the classically influenced ACT Law Courts, Fairlie apartments in South Yarra, and the low-slung Cardinal Knox Centre.

In 1997 Roy Simpson was awarded the Royal Australian Institute of Architects Gold Medal for his significant contribution to architecture.

History

Yuncken Freeman began in 1933 when Otto (Rob) Yuncken and John Freeman together with Freeman's brother, Tom, and William Balcombe Griffiths, all left their positions at A & K Henderson to establish Yuncken, Freeman Brothers and Griffiths. The firm took on hospital work, and designed a series of houses for a wealthy clientele, usually in a refined Georgian mode, but also some more modernist in style.

In 1938 Roy Simpson started work with the firm, and in 1940 completed his studies at the School of Design in University of Melbourne, and was awarded the Robert Haddon travelling scholarship.

The operations of the firm were disrupted by World War II, with Rob Yuncken and Roy Simpson enlisted into service, providing planning and design services to the U.S. Army Engineers Corps. After the war, Yuncken and Simpson returned to Melbourne only to find the members of the original group scattered. They reunited the practice, and Simpson was made a partner to create Yuncken, Freeman Brothers, Griffiths and Simpson. In 1947, Yuncken Freeman was appointed by the Victorian Government to initiate an emergency housing project to provide accommodation for workers on various state projects, possibly due to the experience Simpson and Yuncken gained with the U.S. Army. The result was timber houses, delivered pre-cut and partially assembled, largely produced in England, and shipped to Australia, beginning in 1949. Fifty years later, many of these homes remained occupied.

Barry Patten and John Gates were admitted to the partnership in 1953 following the death of Rob Yuncken in 1951, by which time the firm was simply known as Yuncken Freeman, a name that was made official in 1963. By then Balcombe Griffiths and Roy Simpson were the sole survivors of the five original partners, and had been joined by John Yuncken, Rob's son, Robert Peck, Jamie Learmonth and others. Patten introduced the firm's international modernist architecture style, with work by the 1970s heavily influenced by work of Ludwig Mies van der Rohe, such as their own King Street offices, and especially BHP House, their largest project and Melbourne's tallest building. After this success, the recession of the mid-1970s hit Yuncken Freeman hard, sacking 15 architects, and the 8 directors took a 20% pay cut. Patten told The Age: "The situation is very bad - there just isn't any work available. We have employed people for years and we are now finding it very difficult to keep them occupied. It is very worrying." In 1980, Balcombe Griffiths, Roy Simpson and John gates retired, and the firm was formally wound up in the late 1980s.

Major architectural works

Gallery

See also

Architecture of Australia

References

External links 
 The Arts Centre
 Victorian Heritage Trust
 Sidney Myer Fund
 Walking Melbourne search
 www.theartscentre.com.au
 https://www.youtube.com/watch?v=EiTefVF8Y7c

Architecture firms of Australia